Vanessa "Van" Badham (born 1974) is an Australian writer and activist. A playwright and novelist, she writes dramas and comedies. She is a regular columnist for the Guardian Australia website.

Early life
Badham was born in Sydney in 1974. Her parents worked in the New South Wales gaming and track industry, with her father eventually working as a manager in the registered club industry.

She studied creative writing and performance at the University of Wollongong, graduating with Bachelor of Arts and Bachelor of Creative Arts (Honours) degrees. At university, Badham won the Philip Larkin Poetry Prize in 1997, and the Des Davis Drama Prize and Comedy Prize in 2000. In 2001, she went on an exchange with the University of Sheffield in the UK to study English literature.

At the University of Wollongong, she was drawn into involvement with student politics and left-wing activism, and she was elected editor of the Student Representative Council newspaper, Tertangala. She worked with the Student Union as Media Officer and Women's Officer, and sat on the Academic Senate and University Internationalisation Committee. By 1998, Badham was an avowed anarchist and Small and Regional Campuses Officer and then President of the New South Wales branch of the National Union of Students, caucusing with radical group Non Aligned Left. In 2013, she completed a Master of Arts degree with First Class Honours in Theatre at the Victorian College of the Arts, University of Melbourne.

Writing career
In 1999, Badham won the Naked Theatre Company's first "Write Now!" play competition and with it a production of her winning play, The Wilderness of Mirrors, at the Sydney Theatre Company's Wharf studio. About secret service infiltration of an activist organisation, the play brought her to public attention and she began to stage more work across Australia. In 2001, she relocated to the United Kingdom.

In the UK, Badham's work was discovered by the Crucible Theatre, Sheffield, who staged a collaborative production of Kitchen with Nabokov Theatre in 2001. A play about marriage as a metaphor for capitalism, it then toured to the 2002 Edinburgh Festival Fringe, A 2003 play, Camarilla, was a critical success at the 2003 Edinburgh Festival Fringe, cementing Badham's international reputation as a proponent of radical political theatre. In Australia, her plays have had mainstage seasons at Griffin Theatre, Malthouse Theatre, The Sydney Theatre Company and Black Swan State Theatre Company.

Badham was appointed Literary Manager of London's Finborough Theatre in 2009 and worked there until relocating to Melbourne to become an artistic associate at the Malthouse Theatre from 2011 to 2013. Awards for her theatre work include the 2005 Queensland Premier's Literary Award for Black Hands / Dead Section,  the 2014 New South Wales Premier's Literary Award for Muff and the 2014 Western Australian Premier's Book Awards for The Bull, the Moon and the Coronet of Stars.

In 2009, it was announced that Badham had been signed for a three-book deal by Pan Macmillan Australia. Her first book, Burnt Snow, was released in September 2010. In November 2021 she released her debut non-fiction book with Australian independent publisher Hardie Grant Books, Qanon and On.

Media career
In 2013, Badham began publishing political commentary and arts criticism for the Guardian Australia website. Her commentary has also appeared in publications The New York Times, Bloomberg, The Irish Times, Der Freitag, The Sydney Morning Herald, The Age, Women's Agenda, Australian Cosmopolitan and Daily Life. As a commentator, she has been a guest of The Drum on ABC Television, Politics HQ on Sky News Australia, Radio National, Sunrise and The Project and in 2014, 2015, 2016, 2018 and 2019 was a panellist on the ABC's Q&A programme. Additionally, she has been a featured speaker at the Wheeler Centre, Festival of Dangerous Ideas, All About Women festival, Melbourne Writers Festival and Australian Council of Trade Unions National Congress.

Badham is also an ambassador for the National Secular Lobby.

References

External links
Van Badham scripts held by the Australian Script Centre
Camarilla by Van Badham, published by MIT Press

1974 births
Living people
Australian women dramatists and playwrights
University of Wollongong alumni
20th-century Australian dramatists and playwrights
21st-century Australian dramatists and playwrights
Australian Marxists
Australian feminist writers
21st-century Australian women writers
20th-century Australian women writers